Philip Verdon (22 February 1886 – 18 June 1960) was a British rower who competed in the 1908 Summer Olympics.

Verdon was born in Brixton, London. He was educated at Westminster School London and then at Jesus College, Cambridge. He was the strokeman in the coxless pair with George Fairbairn which won the silver medal for Great Britain rowing at the 1908 Summer Olympics.

In later life he became a consultant ophthalmologist and served in the Indian Medical Service.

References

External links
profile

1886 births
1960 deaths
People educated at Westminster School, London
Alumni of Jesus College, Cambridge
British male rowers
Olympic rowers of Great Britain
Rowers at the 1908 Summer Olympics
Olympic silver medallists for Great Britain
Olympic medalists in rowing
Indian Medical Service officers
British ophthalmologists
Medalists at the 1908 Summer Olympics